Mark Shaw may refer to:

 (born 1945), American lawyer and investigative reporter; see 
Mark Shaw (photographer) (1921–1969), American fashion and celebrity photographer
Mark Shaw (rugby union) (born 1956), former New Zealand rugby union footballer
Mark Shaw (singer) (born 1961), British singer of the band Then Jerico
Mark R. Shaw (1889–1978), U.S. Prohibition Party member
 Mark Jeffrey Shaw (born 1958), Children Of Gabi Shaw wife of Candi Milo

Fictional people 
Mark Shaw (Manhunter), comic book character